Mulberry Grove may refer to:

Mulberry Grove, Georgia
 Mulberry Grove Plantation, Port Wentworth, GA, listed on the NRHP in Georgia
Mulberry Grove, Illinois
 Mulberry Grove (Charles County, Maryland)
 Mulberry Grove (Monroe, Louisiana), listed on the NRHP in Louisiana
 Mulberry Grove (White Castle, Louisiana), listed on the NRHP in Louisiana
 Mulberry Grove (Ahoskie, North Carolina), listed on the NRHP in North Carolina
 Mulberry Grove (Brownsburg, Virginia), listed on the NRHP in Virginia